India competed at the 2021 World Athletics U20 Championships in Nairobi, Kenya, from 18 to 22 August 2021.

Medalists

Results
(q – qualified, NM – no mark, SB – season-best)

Men
Track and road events

Field events

Women
Track and road events

Field events

Mixed

Track and road events

References

2021 in Indian sport